The A8 motorway, also known as The Union Motorway or the East-West Motorway is a planned motorway in Romania, that will cross the Eastern Carpathians to connect the historical regions of Moldavia and Transylvania. 

Early plans estimated the first opening as early as 2009. At its eastern end, the motorway will cross the Prut river at Ungheni to reach Moldova's R1 highway, which further heads east towards Chișinău.

Pre-feasibility studies performed in 2007 were followed by feasibility studies in 2009–2011. As of February 2015, the feasibility study revision and update is being conducted by private contractors.  The auction for the execution of the Târgu Mureș - Târgu Neamț segment were expected to be launched in 2021. 

The tenders for two sections (Section 1 - 22km: Târgu Mureș - Miercurea Nirajului and Section 3 - 29.91km: Leghin – Târgu Neamț) are set to be submitted by 27 February 2023 and 28 February 2023 respectively. The duration of the contracts are 30 months long, 6 months for planning and 24 months for the execution.

See also
Roads in Romania
Transport in Romania

References

External links
CNADNR – Târgu Mureș - Iași - Ungheni
Map of the planned motorway route, alternate

Proposed roads in Romania
Motorways in Romania